was a Japanese long-distance runner who competed in the marathon. She represented her native country twice at the Summer Olympics: in 1992 (12th place in the 10,000 metres) and 1996 (12th place in the women's marathon). She competed for the Wacoal corporate team during her career.

In addition to her Olympic appearances, Maki competed three times at the IAAF World Cross Country Championships (1991 to 1993) with her best performance being 22nd in the 1991 women's race. She was also a two-time participant at the World Championships in Athletics in the 10,000 m, coming 20th in 1991 and 17th in 1993. She won the Japanese Championship in the 10,000 m once in her career, in 1992.

Maki had back-to-back wins at the Shibetsu Half Marathon in 1993 and 1994, and also won the Gold Coast Half Marathon in the latter year. She was the initial winner of the 1995 Sapporo Half Marathon in a time of 70:10 minutes, but was disqualified for a doping violation and banned for three month.

Later in her career she focused on marathon running. She won the 1996 Nagoya International Women's Marathon and the Pilot Marathon in 1998. She retired from the sport in the late 1990s. She is now a training advisor to the Fujita Running Academy.

Maki holds the Asian record for the infrequently contested 20,000 m track race, a mark which was formerly the world record for the event.

She died of breast cancer on October 18, 2018. She was 49.

Personal bests
5000 metres – 15:27.12 min (19910
10,000 metres – 31:40.38 min (1992 – former Japanese record)
One hour run – 17.693 m (1994)
20,000 metres – 66:48 min (1993)
Half marathon – 68:18 min (1996)
Marathon – 2:27:32 hrs (1996)

International competitions

References

External links



1968 births
2018 deaths
Sportspeople from Ehime Prefecture
Japanese female long-distance runners
Japanese female marathon runners
Japanese female cross country runners
Olympic female marathon runners
Olympic athletes of Japan
Athletes (track and field) at the 1992 Summer Olympics
Athletes (track and field) at the 1996 Summer Olympics
World Athletics Championships athletes for Japan
Japan Championships in Athletics winners
World record setters in athletics (track and field)
Japanese sportspeople in doping cases
Doping cases in athletics
20th-century Japanese women
21st-century Japanese women